Thomas Sinclair was a Scottish professional footballer who played in the Football League for Bolton Wanderers as an inside right.

Personal life 
Sinclair served as a sergeant in 53rd (Bolton) Field Regiment, Royal Artillery, during the Second World War.

References

English Football League players
Year of birth missing
Year of death missing
Footballers from Glasgow
Scottish footballers
Association football inside forwards
Glasgow United F.C. players
Bolton Wanderers F.C. players
British Army personnel of World War II
Royal Artillery soldiers